Aethes geniculata is a species of moth of the family Tortricidae. It was described by Edward Meyrick in 1930. It is found in Assam, India.

References

geniculata
Moths described in 1930
Moths of Asia
Taxa named by Edward Meyrick